WTA 1000 is a category of tennis tournaments on the WTA Tour organized by the Women's Tennis Association.

The Series was initially called WTA Tier I which began in 1988 and lasted until 2008. Records before 1990 are excluded from this list. When the WTA Tour was established in 1990 there were initially six Tier I tournaments held annually in the first three years. The list thereafter expanded to eight events in 1993, nine in 1997 and ten in 2004, before being scaled back to nine for 2008.

In 2009 the WTA changed the tournament categories, so that the majority of Tier I and Tier II tournaments were in one category, Premier Tournaments, split into three categories: two of them being Premier Mandatory and Premier 5, comprising all the current nine events being held with Wuhan, which replaced Tokyo in 2014, as the only exception.

WTA Premier Mandatory and Premier 5 tournaments merged into a single highest tier and it is implemented since the reorganization of the schedule in 2021. There are nine WTA 1000 tournaments which divide into two categories: Mandatory and non-Mandatory. There are four Mandatory tournaments: Indian Wells, Miami, Madrid and Beijing and five non-Mandatory tournaments: Doha/Dubai, Rome, Cincinnati, Canada and Wuhan.

Only three tournaments were held in 2020 due to the Coronavirus pandemic: Doha, Rome and Cincinnati.

Guadalajara replaced Wuhan and Beijing in 2022 due to Peng Shuai allegation.

These tournaments offer ranking points: 1,000 for a Premier Mandatory and 900 for a non-Mandatory tournament.

Champions by year 
 New tournaments underlined.

Tier I (1990–2008)

Premier / 1000 (since 2009)

Title leaders 

 Players with 5+ titles. Active players and records are denoted in bold.
 68 champions in 281 events as of 2023 Indian Wells.

Career totals 
 Active players in bold.

 Statistics correct as of 2023 Indian Wells. To avoid double counting, they should be updated at the conclusion of a tournament or when the player's participation has ended.

Season records

Tournament records

Most titles per tournament

Consecutive records

Title defence

See also 

WTA Tour
 WTA 1000
 WTA Premier Mandatory and Premier 5
 WTA Tier I tournaments

ATP Tour
 ATP Tour Masters 1000
 Tennis Masters Series singles records and statistics
 Tennis Masters Series doubles records and statistics

References

External links 
WTA Tour official website

WTA 1000 tournaments

Tennis records and statistics
Recurring sporting events disestablished in 2008
Recurring sporting events established in 1990